Henfenfeld is a municipality near Nuremberg in the Frankenalb (Frankish Alb) directly south of Hersbruck. The town was first mentioned in a letter dating from 13 April 1059. The town is best known for its castle.

References

External links
  - official website for the town
  - official website for the Henfenfeld castle.

Nürnberger Land